Quartet in Autumn is a novel by British novelist Barbara Pym, first published in 1977. It was highly praised and shortlisted for the Booker Prize, the top literary prize in the UK. This was considered a comeback novel for Pym; she had fallen out of favour as styles changed, and her work had been rejected by publishers for 15 years. This followed her successful record as a novelist during the 1950s and early 1960s. As a novel, it represents a departure from her earlier style of light comedy, as it is the story of four office workers on the verge of retirement.

Plot summary
Marcia, Letty, Norman and Edwin all work together in the same office. None is married (Edwin being a widower) and each is nearing retirement age.  Letty has plans to share a country retreat with her long-time friend, Marjorie. Her hopes are dashed when Marjorie suddenly announces that she is to marry a clergyman some years younger than she.

After Marcia and Letty retire, each is faced with challenges. Letty suddenly has to move and Marcia has to deal with a loss of the routine that was an essential part of her life.  Marcia gradually withdraws from the outside world, while Letty has to engage with it. Marcia eventually gives up eating and dies in pathetic circumstances. She has unexpectedly left her estate to Norman, in whom she had indulged a brief and secret semi-romantic interest.

When Marjorie's fiancé deserts her for a younger widow, Letty and her friend decided to take the country cottage after all. By now she has come to terms with retirement, her world has expanded, and so she does not immediately move. She realizes that she has opportunities to make her own choices. Norman and Edwin play less central roles in the "quartet", as their characters develop in response to the absences and actions of Marcia and Letty.

At the end of the book, Letty is looking forward to inviting Norman and Edwin to meet Marjorie in the country. She thinks this would be a huge "opportunity" for the quartet, which was previously so urban and parochial, even though they have lost Marcia.

Publication history
Pym conceived of the novel in 1972:

At the time, Pym was still working full-time at the International African Institute in London, and recovering from a mastectomy after developing cancer in her left breast. As she transitioned to retirement in late 1973 and 1974, Pym commenced work on the novel. Whereas most of her novels had been written in short time spans, Pym took three years to write Quartet in Autumn. She had not had a novel published since 1961, and had no realistic expectations that this would be either. She completed the novel in 1976, under the original title of Four Point Turn. The poet Philip Larkin, who had a long-running correspondence with Pym, read the final draft and found it very strong. He was surprised by the sombre tone, so unlike Pym's earlier comic style, and suggested the title did not suit. Pym submitted the novel to Hamish Hamilton Limited in 1976 but it was rejected.

On 21 January 1977, The Times Literary Supplement ran an article in which high-profile literary figures listed their most underrated and overrated British novelists of the century. Pym was chosen as the most underrated writer by both Larkin and Lord David Cecil; she was the only novelist to be selected by two contributors. On the strength of this review, literary interest in Pym was revived after 16 years, and she was approached by several publishers for new material.

Quartet in Autumn was published by Macmillan in 1977. It was published in the United States by E.P. Dutton the following year, the second of her novels to do so (Less than Angels had been published in a small run in the 1950s) and the first to have mainstream success in the US.

The novel was released as an audiobook by Chivers Press, read by Elizabeth Stephan. It was published in Portugal as Quarteto no Outono, France as Quatuor d'automne, Germany as Quartett im Herbst, and Turkey as Sonbahar Kuarteti.

Reception
Combined with the media interest after the piece in The Times, Quartet in Autumn was a success, with almost universally positive reviews, including in The Guardian and The Sunday Times. Kirkus Reviews considered the book "Terribly brisk, but very affecting". The only publications to write mixed reviews were The Sunday Telegraph and the New Statesman. As this was the first time most American readers had heard of Pym, there was especial interest in her from American media outlets. The New York Review of Books favourably reviewed Quartet alongside the earlier Excellent Women while The New York Times published a review entitled The Best High Comedy.

The novel was shortlisted for the 1977 Booker Prize however was defeated by Paul Scott's Staying On.

Adaptation
Quartet in Autumn was serialised by BBC radio on its Woman's Hour program in 1978.

In 2015, York Theatre Royal commissioned a workshop version of a stage adaptation, written by Amanda Whittington and directed by C P Hallam.

References

1977 British novels
Novels by Barbara Pym
Macmillan Publishers books